Carnidazole (trade names Spartrix, Pantrix, Gambamix) is an antiprotozoal drug of the nitroimidazole class used in veterinary medicine. It is used to treat Trichomonas infection in pigeons.

References

Antiprotozoal agents
Nitroimidazoles
Veterinary drugs
Thiocarbamates